Lindisfarne College was a private school or independent school. It was founded in 1891 in Westcliff-on-Sea in Essex, England. In 1940 Lindisfarne College moved from Westcliff to nearby Creeksea Place, but during the Second World War the building was requisitioned by the military and the school transferred to Newburgh Priory at Coxwold in Yorkshire.

In 1950 the school made its final move to Wynnstay in Ruabon, Wrexham, north Wales, which had once been the ancestral home of the Williams-Wynn family. The school itself closed due to insolvency in 1994, and its last home was converted into luxury apartments.

Notable former pupils

Mulatu Astatke, jazz musician
John Bowlby, psychotherapist, pioneer of Attachment Theory
George A. David, entrepreneur and philanthropist
Laurence Gower (1913-1997), academic and Vice-Chancellor of Southampton University from 1971 to 1979 and notable for the Gower Report on financial services
Peter Lewis, British Army officer and journalist
Penny Rimbaud, writer, poet, philosopher, painter, musician and activist

1891 establishments in England
1994 disestablishments in England
Defunct schools in Wrexham County Borough
Educational institutions established in 1891
Educational institutions disestablished in 1994
Ruabon